Grankin is a Russian masculine surname, its feminine counterpart is Grankina. Notable people with the surname include:

Andrei Grankin (born 1987), Russian ice hockey player 
Sergey Grankin (born 1985), Russian volleyball player

Russian-language surnames